Omar Guerrero Orozco (born March 20, 1946), Ph.D. in Public Administration by the National Autonomous University of Mexico, is full-time professor at the same institution and National Researcher Level III, which is the maximum level. He was member of the Social Sciences Committee of the National System of Researchers (1999 to 2003), collegial body in which he served as president (2003). He was recipient in 1979 of the “Public Administration Award” granted by the INAP. Guerrero is also member of the National Academy of Sciences since 1987 and of the Mexican Culture Seminar since 2006.

In this same year he was awarded by the National Association of Universities and Higher Education Institutions (ANUIES in Spanish) with the ANUIES Award for his academic contribution to the Higher education 2006. Recently he was granted a Honoris Causa Doctorate by the University of Sonora.

Academic contribution 

Doctor Guerrero has realized an intense international labor in curricular development as expert in Public Administration in several countries such as Argentina, Bolivia, Brazil, Colombia, Costa Rica, Guatemala, Nicaragua, Dominican Republic, Peru, Uruguay and Venezuela as well as in Mexico. In these countries he has also dictated courses and lectures. Besides Mexico some of his books and articles have been published in Spain, Colombia, Puerto Rico, Venezuela, Ecuador, Belgium and Brazil. Most of his books are available at libraries in the United States such as the Library of Congress at Washington and of the City of New York, as well as in universities such as those of New York, Florida, Princeton, Stanford, Illinois, Harvard, Duke, Virginia, Notre Dame, Tulane, Yale, Texas at Austin, California. And around the world in countries such as Puerto Rico, Spain (INAP) and Venezuela (CLAD).
 
For four decades, Guerrero has unfolded a continuous labor in the social sciences area. Particularly, he has stressed the scientific development of public administration, work that has been done through the analysis of subject matter of the public administration based in its epistemological and methodological foundations. At the same time he has carried out a labor of setting the genealogy of the history of ideas in public administration around the world. He has himself set the objective of searching, finding, and publishing the major works of the greatest thinkers that headed the gestation of science of public administration. Specifically his contribution has consisted in the publication for the Spanish-speaking audience of some of the classic books of administrative thought.

Omar Guerrero has created a vast work on Mexican public administration. From this endeavor emerged a general interpretation of the evolution of public administration from eighteenth century to the present; exploring its origins in the Bourbon reform, and following its trace through nineteenth and arriving finally in the twentieth century. Guerrero’s research has extended to current Mexican public administration, topic that has been diffused through publications on the administrative career and professionalization of public officers. These works stand as representatives of his expertise on this subject.

He has also conducted an exhaustive exploration of the subject matter of public administration, task in which he has contributed to the scientific development of the discipline in both national and international level. Since a pair of decades ago Guerrero has made an effort to identify and define the field of scientific study of public administration. It is an ongoing task to date. His contributions to contemporary public administration in the last five years are paramount, particularly on issues such as state-reform and public management.

The research interests of Omar Guerrero embrace to political science and public policy, as well as the history of political ideas. In these areas he has mainly published articles and essays booklets.

Publications 

Published books

 Teoría Administrativa de la Ciencia Política. México, Universidad Nacional Autónoma de México. 1976.
 La Administración Pública del Estado Capitalista. Barcelona, España. 1980.
 El Proceso Histórico de la Acción Gubernamental. México, Instituto Nacional de Administración Pública. 1983.
 Introducción a la Administración Pública. México, Harper and Row Latinoamericana. 1984.
 La Teoría de la Administración Pública. México, Harper and Row Latinoamericana. 1886.
 Las Ciencias de la Administración en el Estado Absolutista. México, Fontamara. 1986.
 El Estado y la Administración Pública en México. México, Instituto Nacional de Administración Pública. 1989.
 La Administración Pública en el Estado de Guerrero. México, Instituto de Administración Pública del Estado de Guerrero. 1991.
 El Estado en la Era de la Modernización. México. Editorial Plaza y Valdés. 1992.
 Historia de la Secretaría de Relaciones Exteriores. Instituto Matías Romero de Estudios Diplomáticos, Secretaría de Relaciones Exteriores. 1993.
 Las Raíces Borbónicas del Estado Mexicano. México, Coordinación de Humanidades de la UNAM. 1995.
 La Formación Profesional de Administradores Públicos en México. Toluca, Instituto de Administración Pública del Estado de México, Universidad Autónoma del Estado de México y Centro Latinoamericano de Administración para el Desarrollo. 1995.
 La Secretaría de Justicia y el Estado de Derecho en México. México, Instituto de Investigaciones Jurídicas, UNAM. 1995.
 Principios de Administración Pública. Santafé de Bogotá, Colombia. Escuela Superior de Administración Pública. 1997.
 El Funcionario, el Diplomático y el Juez: Las Experiencias en la Formación Profesional del Servicio Público en el Mundo. Universidad de Guanajuato, Instituto de Administración Pública de Guanajuato, Instituto Nacional de Administración Pública y Edit. Plaza y Valdés. 1998.
 Del Estado Gerencial al Estado Cívico. México, Universidad Autónoma del Estado de México y Editorial Miguel Ángel Porrúa. 1999.
 Teoría Administrativa del Estado. México, Oxford University Press. 2000.
 Gerencia Pública en la Globalización. México, Miguel Ángel Porrúa y Universidad Autónoma del Estado de México. 2003.
 La Ley del Servicio Profesional de Carrera en la Administración Pública Federal: una Apreciación Administrativa. México, Instituto de Investigaciones Jurídicas, UNAM. 2003.
 La Nueva Gerencia Pública: Neoliberalismo en Administración Pública. México, Edit. Fontamara. 2004.
 Tecnocracia o el Fin de la Política. México, Instituto de Investigaciones Jurídicas, UNAM. 2006.
 El Neoliberalismo: de la Ideología a la Utopía, México, Editorial Fontamara, 2009.
 La Administración Pública a través de las Ciencias Sociales. México, Fondo de Cultura Económica, 2010.
 Historia de la Secretaría de Gobernación. México, Instituto de Investigaciones Jurídicas y Editorial Porrúa Hermanos. 2011.

Classic books edition

 Florentino González, Elementos de Ciencia Administrativa (1840). Bogotá, Escuela Superior de Administración Pública de Colombia. 1994.
 Juan Enrique von Justi, Ciencia del Estado [Versión fiel de los Elementos Generales de Policía, con base en la edición española de 1784]. Institutos de Administración Pública del Estado de México, Institutos Nacionales de Administración Pública de México y de España, y Agencia Española de Cooperación Iberoamericana. 1996.
 Charles-Jean Bonnin, Principios de Administración Pública. México, Fondo de Cultura Económica. 2004.
 Kautilya, Arthasastra de (siglo IV a.c). Toluca, Facultad de Ciencias Políticas y Administración Pública, Universidad Autónoma del Estado de México y Miguel Ángel Porrúa. 2009.
 Varios, Historia del Servicio Civil de Carrera en México. México, Universidad Autónoma del Estado de México, Instituto de Administración Pública del Estado de México y Miguel Ángel Porrúa. 2011.

Articles published

In Social Science Research Network.

 The Formulation of the Principles of Public Administration. (259,513). Posted: 21 December 13. 
 Reflections on the Science of Public Administration. (364,388). Posted: 6 March 14.
 The Practice of Public Administration. (356,865). Posted: 5 March 14.
 Methodology in Public Administration. (371,900). Posted: 1 April 14.
 Rhetoric in Public Administration Scientific Research. (337,021). Posted: 4 May 14.
 Origin and Development of the Ideas in Public Administration. (390,604). Posted: 14 May 14.

References

External links 

Omar Guerrero's website.
Website of the classic author Charles Jean Bonnin.
Social Science Research Network website.

1946 births
Living people
National Autonomous University of Mexico alumni
Academic staff of the National Autonomous University of Mexico
People from Mexico City